Gymnoglossum is a genus of fungi in the Bolbitiaceae family of mushrooms.

External links

Bolbitiaceae
Agaricales genera